The 1946 Copa Escobar-Gerona, also named Copa de Confraternidad Rioplatense, was the 4th (and last) edition of this cup competition organised jointly by the Argentine and Uruguayan football associations. The 1946 edition of the cup was the only edition out of the four editions in which the title was awarded to one club, rather than the two of the previous year or the none of 1941 and 1942.

Overview
Boca Juniors (Primera División Argentina runner-up) faced Peñarol (Uruguayan Primera División runner-up) in a two-legged series at Estadio Centenario in Montevideo, Uruguay and San Lorenzo Stadium in Buenos Aires, Argentina. Boca Juniors won both matches, winning 3–2 in Montevideo and 6–3 in Buenos Aires.

Boca Juniors forward Pío Corcuera was the top scorer of the series, with 4 goals.

Qualified teams 

Note

Venues

Match details

First leg 

|

|}

Second leg 

|

|}

References

e
e
1946 in Argentine football
1946 in Uruguayan football
Football in Buenos Aires
Football in Montevideo